"Who Are You?" is a song by Eternal released as the fourth single from the album Power of a Woman. The single was only released in Japan. It was produced by producers Ronnie Wilson and Dennis Charles.

The song was used in a South East Asian Toyota advertisement, and reached no. 1 on the Japanese singles chart.

Track listing

References 

1996 singles
Eternal (band) songs
1996 songs
EMI Records singles